Floodgates is a 1924 American silent drama film directed by George Irving and starring John Lowell, Evangeline Russell, and Jane Thomas.

Plot
As described in a film magazine review, mill owner Lem Bassett desires to erect a dam for water power, and, in order to secure permission from the land owners in the District, he persuades his foreman Dave Trask to encourage the measure. Trask has implicit faith in Bassett and, through his influence, the landowners agree. Later Bassett floods the land in an effort to purchase the land surrounding the lake. The landowners object and accuse Dave of cheating them. Tom Bassett is in love with Dave's sister Ruth and, while motoring his car, strikes Dave's child Peggy, paralyzing her. The child is taken to Tom's house for an operation and, while the operation is in progress, Dave blows up the dam using dynamite and the rushing waters sweep all before it. The flood reaches Tom's house and Dave rescues the child. Tom is wounded and cannot reach safety. The flood sweeps the house away with Tom clinging on to a piece of debris. He is rescued by Dave after a heroic struggle.

Cast

References

Bibliography
 Munden, Kenneth White. The American Film Institute Catalog of Motion Pictures Produced in the United States, Part 1. University of California Press, 1997.

External links

1924 films
1924 drama films
1920s English-language films
American silent feature films
Silent American drama films
American black-and-white films
Films directed by George Irving
1920s American films